Malek (in Arabic مالك) is a masculine Arabic given name. It also denotes king written (in Arabic ملك or Persian ملک) It may refer to:

Places
 Malek, Iran (disambiguation), places in Iran
 Deh-e Malek, Fars
 Deh-e Malek, Kerman
 Deh Malek, Rabor, Kerman Province
 Gol Malek, Hormozgan
 Gol Malek, Kerman
 Hajji Malek, Sistan and Baluchestan
 Malek Baghi, Markazi, Iran
 Malek Baghi, Zanjan, Iran
 Qaleh Malek, East Azerbaijan
 Qaleh-ye Malek, Isfahan

Others 
 Malek (horse), a Chilean-bred racehorse
 Malek (Legacy of Kain), a character in the Legacy of Kain series
 Malek (given name)
 Malek (surname)

See also 
 Malik, a Semitic word meaning "king"
 Málek, Czech surname
 Enrique Malek International Airport, serving David, a city in the Chiriquí Province of Panama.